Münster (Central Bavarian: Minschda am Leech) is a municipality in the district of Donau-Ries in Bavaria in Germany.

Geography
Münster is located between Rain and Thierhaupten. The village is separated in a lower and a higher part, because it's built on the Lechrain.

Coat of arms
On the coat of arms of Münster in the lower part a swung line, representing the river Lech, is drawn on red and silver ground. The key and sword stand for the two patron saints of the local parish St. Peter and Paul.

References

Donau-Ries